Hovhannes Demirchyan (born 15 August 1975) is a retired Armenian football player.

National team statistics

External links
 

Living people
1975 births
Armenian footballers
Armenia international footballers
FC Shirak players
FC Stal Alchevsk players
Expatriate footballers in Ukraine
Armenian expatriate sportspeople in Ukraine
Ukrainian Premier League players
Association football defenders